David Secord (August 1759 – August 9, 1844) was a businessman and political figure in Upper Canada.

He was born in New York City in 1759. His father served with Butler's Rangers during the American Revolution and David later served as a corporal in the unit. After the war, they settled at Queenston in Upper Canada; David helped establish the community of St Davids where he built a sawmill, gristmill, blacksmith shop and general store. His brother James, whose wife was Laura Secord, also settled there.

In 1796, he was appointed justice of the peace in the Home District. He was elected to the 5th Parliament of Upper Canada representing 2nd Lincoln. He also served in the local militia, eventually reaching the rank of major. His buildings at St Davids were destroyed by the Americans during the War of 1812. He was later elected to the 7th Parliament for 3rd Lincoln. He died at St. Davids in 1844 and was buried in the Methodist cemetery there.

External links 
Biography at the Dictionary of Canadian Biography Online

1759 births
1844 deaths
Members of the Legislative Assembly of Upper Canada
People from Niagara-on-the-Lake